Westby Heath (22 February 1891 – 1961) was an English footballer who played in the Football League for Stockport County as a centre half or centre forward.

Personal life 
Heath was wounded during the course of his service as a private in the Royal Army Medical Corps during the First World War.

Career statistics

Honours 
Stockport County

 Football League Third Division North: 1921–22

References

1891 births
1961 deaths
English footballers
Association football forwards
English Football League players
Luton Town F.C. players
Stockport County F.C. players
Chester City F.C. players
Southern Football League players
British Army personnel of World War I
Royal Army Medical Corps soldiers
Footballers from North Yorkshire
Association football wing halves